The Philadelphia Society for the Preservation of Landmarks (aka Landmarks) founded in 1931, maintains and preserves four historic house museums in the region around Philadelphia, Pennsylvania. These are:

 Grumblethorpe
 Hill-Physick-Keith House
 Powel House
 Waynesborough

These are open for the education and enjoyment of the public and its members.

History
The Philadelphia Society for the Preservation of Landmarks has played a significant role in the historic preservation movement in Philadelphia by restoring, furnishing and presenting to the public its distinguished house museums.

Landmarks has an interesting history of its own. In 1931, roused by the news that the historic Powel House was to be demolished in six weeks, Frances Anne Wister and Sophia Cadwalader and a group of strong supporters (including famous names like Biddle, Barnes, Curtis and Lippincott) founded Landmarks to save the house. The newly formed Landmarks was successful despite the economic depression of the time and within another ten years had acquired Grumblethorpe in Germantown. In the late 1960s, Ambassador and Mrs. Walter Annenberg restored the stately Hill-Physick-Keith House and then donated the house to Landmarks. In 1981, Landmarks entered into an agreement with Easttown Township in Chester County, Pennsylvania to administer Historic Waynesborough.

Today, Landmarks carries on the vision of Miss Wister by managing the four house museums and bringing thousands of visitors and schoolchildren each year to learn about Philadelphia's history.

For the last decade Landmarks has served as the sponsor in the Philadelphia Region for the world-renowned Road Scholar program (formerly known as Elderhostel). On average each year, Landmarks Road Scholar Program attracts over 2,000 visitors to the Philadelphia Region to enjoy its many historical and cultural resources. Landmarks Road Scholar ranks 20th out of a total of 638 sponsors around the world. Landmarks is a major supporter of the Philadelphia Orchestra, Philadelphia Museum of Art, Philadelphia Flower Show and The Barnes Foundation among others through its purchase of admission tickets to these fine organizations. Accounting for over $500,000 in purchases of hotel rooms and services throughout the region, Landmarks Road Scholar plays a significant role in the Philadelphia Region's tourism economy.

Landmarks Contemporary Projects
For over eighty years, the Philadelphia Society for the Preservation of Landmarks has played a significant role in the historic preservation movement in Philadelphia by restoring, furnishing and presenting to the public its four distinguished house museums: Grumblethorpe, Physick House, Powel House and Waynesborough. While remaining committed to preserving and interpreting the past, Landmarks is moving into the future with a renewed mission to expand beyond business-as-usual, explore new conceptual territories, create new collaborations and make its houses relevant to today's audiences. To that end, working with founding curator Robert Wuilfe, the organization in 2006 created a new program called Landmarks Contemporary Projects.

Landmarks Contemporary Projects is a program of exhibitions, residencies, screenings, lectures, performances and educational strategies that is bringing new and experimental contemporary culture from Philadelphia and beyond to historic sites. Landmarks Contemporary Projects tries to provide a thoughtful alternative for audiences, creative opportunities for artists and new partnerships with other organizations. The core of the program is an exhibition/residency program in which Landmarks invites artists to explore and react to its  properties and collections and create site-specific installations. By providing an experimental atmosphere in which artists are free to create new work and question basic assumptions of historical preservation, Landmarks hopes to stimulate discourse and challenge accepted approaches to both house-museums and contemporary art.

To date, Landmarks Contemporary Projects has offered opportunities to a wide range of emerging and established artists. Projects thus far have included:
Megawords
Candy Depew
An ongoing partnership with Bowerbird
David Gatten
Roxana Perez-Mendez
Karen Kilimnik
Caitlin Perkins
Zoe Cohen
Virginia Maksymowicz
Michelle Wilson
Caroline Lathan-Stiefel
Phuong X. Pham
Marie H. Elcin
J. Makary
Nadia Hironaka and Matthew Suib

See also

External links

Landmarks Contemporary Projects
Frederick James's 1881 painting, Mischianza, showing Grumblethorpe

Heritage organizations
Organizations based in Pennsylvania
Organizations based in Philadelphia
History of Philadelphia
Society for the Preservation of Landmarks
Society for the Preservation of Landmarks
1931 establishments in Pennsylvania
Organizations established in 1931